Headplate is a Swedish nu metal band from the city of Gothenburg. The band was formed in 1993, by drummer Niklas Österlund and guitarist Daniel (Schou) Granstedt. Almost all of their songs are free to download at their own website.

In 1999 the band signed with Gain Productions / Gain Recordings, also from Gothenburg, Sweden. Headplate performed at several Scandinavian festivals during 2001 and 2002, for instance Hultsfredsfestivalen 2001 and Tuska Open Air Metal Festival in 2001. During these years they also did a couple of shows as the supported act for Hardcore Superstar, LOK and Machine Head. The band has released four studio albums: Bullsized (2000), Delicate (2002), Pieces (2003) and 12-12-12 (2012).

Discography

Albums 
 Sleepy (1998, Demo Album, no label)
 Bullsized (2000, Studio Album, Gain Productions/Gain Recordings)
 Delicate (2002, Studio Album, Gain Productions/Gain Recordings)
 Pieces (2003, Compilation, Gain Productions/Gain Recordings)
 12-12-12 (2012, Studio Album, DGS / DGS)

Videos
 "Bullsized" (2000)
 "Feel Like Porn" (2001)
 "Jump the Bridge" (2002)

Lineup

Members 
Daniel Granstedt - guitars, backing vocals (1993–present)
Niklas Österlund - drums (1993–present)
Håkan Skoger - bass (1994-2003, 2012–present)
Johan Andreassen - bass (2003-2005, 2012–present)
Hezzy - vocals (2012–present)

Former members
Magnus Klavborn - vocals (1998-2005) (former lead singer of Engel)
Marcus Österlund - bass (1993-1994), guitars (1994-1999)

References

External links

 

Swedish alternative metal musical groups
Swedish alternative rock groups
Musical groups established in 1993
Swedish nu metal musical groups
Musical groups from Gothenburg
1993 establishments in Sweden